Pobiedna  is a village in the administrative district of Gmina Leśna, within Lubań County, Lower Silesian Voivodeship, in south-western Poland.

Geography
Located at the foot of Mt. Smrk, the village is part of the historic Upper Lusatia region on the border with Lower Silesia. In the south, the crest of the Jizera Mountains marks the border with Bohemia, today part of the Czech Republic. The village has a population of 1,300.

History

The older part of the village was originally named Mayfarthsdorff, as they were situated on a May pilgrimage route, which became corrupted to Meffersdorf. It belonged to the burgraviate of Świecie (Schwerta) Castle, a possession of King John of Bohemia since 1329. Meffersdorf was elevated to a barony in its own right in 1592, held by the Lords of Uichteritz.

After the Upper Lusatian lands had passed to Saxony by the 1635 Peace of Prague, its inhabitants, mostly expellees of the Bohemian Unity of the Brethren from neighbouring Nové Město, received a town charter and mining rights by Elector John George II in 1667. It took the name Meffersdorfer Städtel, but was renamed Wigandsthal in 1688, in honour of its founder Baron Wigand von Gersdorff.

Upon the annexation of northeastern Upper Lusatia by Prussia according to the Final Act of the 1815 Vienna Congress, its town charter was annulled and the region attached to the Silesia Province. Following the implementation of the Oder–Neisse line as the Polish–German border after World War II, the village passed to the Republic of Poland, and was renamed Pobiedna in 1947.

External links
Information about Pobiedna
Association of Friends of Pobiednej
History of Unięcice and Pobiedna

Pobiedna